The sixth season of the American competitive reality television series MasterChef Junior premiered on Fox on March 2, 2018 and concluded on May 18, 2018. The season is hosted by regular judges Gordon Ramsay, Christina Tosi, and returning judge Joe Bastianich.

The winner was Beni Cwiakala, a 9-year-old from Chicago, Illinois, with Avery Meadows from Kingwood, Texas and Quani Fields from Lawrenceville, Georgia being the runners-up. This marks the first time that three contestants have gone against each other in the finale.

Top 24

Elimination table

  (WINNER) This cook won the competition.
  (RUNNERS-UP) These cooks finished in second place.
  (WIN) The cook won an individual challenge (Mystery Box Challenge, Elimination Test, or Skills Challenge).
  (WIN) The cook was on the winning team in the Team Challenge and directly advanced to the next round.
  (HIGH) The cook was one of the top entries in the individual challenge but didn't win.
  (IN) The cook was not selected as a top or bottom entry in an individual challenge.
  (IN) The cook was not selected as a top or bottom entry in a Team Challenge.
  (IMM) The cook did not have to compete in that round of the competition and was safe from elimination.
  (IMM) The cook was selected by the Mystery Box Challenge winner and didn't have to compete in the Elimination Test.
  (LOW) The cook was one of the bottom entries in an individual challenge or Pressure Test advanced.
  (LOW) The cook was one of the bottom entries in a Team Challenge, and they advanced.
  (PT) The cook was on the losing team in the Team Challenge, competed in the Pressure Test, and advanced.
  (ELIM) The cook was eliminated.

Guest appearances
 Matilda Ramsay − Episode 7
 Alexander Weiss, Logan Guleff, Nathan Odom, Addison Osta Smith,  Jasmine Stewart and other MasterChef Junior alumni − Episode 12

Episodes

References

2018 American television seasons
Season 6